Dafne Fernández Fernández (born 31 March 1985 in Madrid, Spain) is a Spanish actress and dancer.

Dafne became famous for playing Marta Ramos in the Spanish TV series Un paso adelante, along with actors like Mónica Cruz, Beatriz Luengo, Pablo Puyol, Silvia Marty and Lola Herrera. She studied dance and dramatic art, worked in the Fama musical, was the presenter of the XXI Goya Awards (2007) and also appeared in Naím Thomas'''s "Caliente" videoclip.

In 2017 she played Blanca in Perfect Strangers, directed by Álex de la Iglesia. In 2018 she appeared in the third season of MasterChef Celebrity. She was the third contestant to be eliminated.

She dubbed Beladga alongside Michelle Jenner, who dubbed Aloy, in the PS4 video game Horizon: Zero Dawn'' (2017).

Personal life
On September 2, 2017, she married the photographer Mario Chavarría. They have one son, Jon, born on August 30, 2018, and one daughter, Alex, born on December 9, 2020.

Filmography

References

External links 

Photos, revistas

1985 births
Living people
Spanish television actresses
Spanish female dancers
Actresses from Madrid
21st-century Spanish singers
21st-century Spanish women singers
21st-century Spanish actresses